As Zeus Meilichius or Meilichios, the Olympian of Greek mythology subsumed as an attributive epithet to an earlier chthonic daimon; Meilichios, who was propitiated in Athens by archaic rituals, as Jane Ellen Harrison demonstrated in detail in Prolegomena to the Study of Greek Religion (1903). In the course of examining the archaic aspects of the Diasia festival, the greatest Athenian festival accorded Zeus, she showed that it had been superimposed upon an earlier propitiatory ceremony.

"Meilichios", the "Easy-to-be-entreated", the gracious, accessible one, was the Euphemism aspect of "Maimaktes, he who rages eager, panting and thirsting for blood." (Harrison, p. 17).

Explicitly inscribed votive reliefs show that Meilichios was figured in the form of a serpent, who might be invoked as a kind of Ploutos, bringer of wealth. He had some of the avenging and fearful character of an Erynis, for Pausanias saw near the River Cephissus "an ancient altar of Zeus Meilichios; on it Theseus received purification from the descendants of Phytalos after he had slain among other robbers Sinis, who was related to himself".  Meilichios' sacrifice was a holocaust, which was wholly consumed in fire and not shared by the votaries, "a dread renunciation to a dreadful power" (Harrison, p. 16), in nocturnal rites performed in an atmosphere of "chilly gloom" (Harrison), that was rendered in Greek as stygiotes.

While bearing the name 'Zeus', Zeus Olympios, the great king of the gods, noticeably differs from the Zeus Meilichios, a decidedly Chthonian character, often portrayed as a snake, and as seen beforehand, they cannot be different manifestations of the same god, in fact whenever 'another Zeus' is mentioned, this always refers to Hades. Zeus Meilichios and Zeus Eubouleus are often referred to being alternate names for Hades.

Notes

References
Harrison, Jane Ellen, (1903) 1991. Prolegomena to the Study of Greek Religion (Princeton: Princeton University Press),  pp. 12–28.
Schlesier, Renate (2012). A Different God?: Dionysos and Ancient Polytheism. Berlin, Germany.: Freie University. pp. 27, 28. .
Hornblower, Spawforth, Eidinow, Simon, Antony, Esther (2014). The Oxford Companion to Classical Civilization. Oxford: OUP Oxford. p. 354. .

Religion in ancient Athens
Epithets of Zeus
Greek gods
Archaic Athens
Daimons
Chthonic beings